The 36th annual Toronto International Film Festival (TIFF) was held in Toronto, Ontario, Canada between September 8 and September 18, 2011.
Buenos Aires, Argentina was selected to be showcased for the 2011 City to City programme. The opening film was From the Sky Down, a documentary film about the band U2, directed by Davis Guggenheim. Considerable media attention at the time focused on Madonna's behaviour during the festival.

Awards

Programmes

Gala Presentations
Albert Nobbs by Rodrigo García
The Awakening by Nick Murphy
Beloved by Christophe Honoré
Butter by Jim Field Smith
A Dangerous Method by David Cronenberg
From the Sky Down by Davis Guggenheim
A Happy Event by Rémi Bezançon
Hysteria by Tanya Wexler
The Ides of March by George Clooney
Killer Elite by Gary McKendry
The Lady by Luc Besson
Machine Gun Preacher by Marc Forster
Moneyball by Bennett Miller
Page Eight by David Hare
Peace, Love and Misunderstanding by Bruce Beresford
Starbuck by Ken Scott
Take This Waltz by Sarah Polley
Trespass by Joel Schumacher
W.E. by Madonna
Winnie by Darrell Roodt

Masters
Almayer's Folly by Chantal Akerman
Faust by Alexander Sokurov
Hard Core Logo 2 by Bruce McDonald
Le Havre by Aki Kaurismäki
I Wish by Hirokazu Koreeda
The Kid with a Bike by Dardenne brothers
Once Upon a Time in Anatolia by Nuri Bilge Ceylan
Outside Satan by Bruno Dumont
Pina by Wim Wenders
Restless by Gus Van Sant
The Snows of Kilimanjaro by Robert Guédiguian
This Is Not a Film by Mojtaba Mirtahmasb and Jafar Panahi
The Turin Horse by Béla Tarr and Ágnes Hranitzky

Special Presentations

11 Flowers by Wang Xiaoshuai
360 by Fernando Meirelles
50/50 by Jonathan Levine
Afghan Luke by Mike Clattenburg
Americano by Mathieu Demy
Anonymous by Roland Emmerich
The Artist by Michel Hazanavicius
Une vie meilleure by Cédric Kahn
Breakaway by Robert Lieberman
Burning Man by Jonathan Teplitzky
Café de Flore by Jean-Marc Vallée
The Cardboard Village by Ermanno Olmi
Chicken with Plums by Vincent Paronnaud and Marjane Satrapi
Coriolanus by Ralph Fiennes
Countdown by Huh Jong-ho
Damsels in Distress by Whit Stillman
Dark Horse by Todd Solondz
Death of a Superhero by Ian Fitzgibbon
The Deep Blue Sea by Terence Davies
The Descendants by Alexander Payne
Drive by Nicolas Winding Refn
Citizen Gangster by Nathan Morlando
Elles by Małgorzata Szumowska
The Eye of the Storm by Fred Schepisi
The First Man by Gianni Amelio
Friends with Kids by Jennifer Westfeldt
Goon by Michael Dowse
We Have a Pope by Nanni Moretti
Headhunters by Morten Tyldum
Hick by Derick Martini
The Hunter by Daniel Nettheim
In Darkness by Agnieszka Holland
Intruders by Juan Carlos Fresnadillo
Jeff Who Lives at Home by Jay Duplass and Mark Duplass
Keyhole by Guy Maddin
Killer Joe by William Friedkin
Life Without Principle by Johnnie To
Like Crazy by Drake Doremus
Low Life by Nicolas Klotz
Martha Marcy May Marlene by Sean Durkin
Mausam by Pankaj Kapoor
Melancholia by Lars von Trier
Monsieur Lazhar by Philippe Falardeau
The Moth Diaries by Mary Harron
My Worst Nightmare by Anne Fontaine
The Oranges by Julian Farino
Pearl Jam Twenty by Cameron Crowe
Rampart by Oren Moverman
Rebellion by Mathieu Kassovitz
Salmon Fishing in the Yemen by Lasse Hallström
Shame by Steve McQueen
A Simple Life by Ann Hui
The Skin I Live In by Pedro Almodóvar
Sleeping Beauty by Julia Leigh
Take Shelter by Jeff Nichols
10 Years by Jamie Linden
Terraferma by Emanuele Crialese
A Burning Hot Summer (That Summer) by Philippe Garrel
Trishna by Michael Winterbottom
Twixt by Francis Ford Coppola
Tyrannosaur by Paddy Considine
Violet & Daisy by Geoffrey S. Fletcher
Warriors of the Rainbow: Seediq Bale by Wei Te-sheng
We Need to Talk About Kevin by Lynne Ramsay
Where Do We Go Now? by Nadine Labaki
The Woman in the Fifth by Paweł Pawlikowski
Wuthering Heights by Andrea Arnold

Discovery
Las acacias by Pablo Giorgelli
Alois Nebel by Tomáš Luňák
Among Us by Marco van Geffen
Avalon by Axel Petersén
Back to Stay by Milagros Mumenthaler
Behold the Lamb by John McIlduff
Breathing by Karl Markovics
The Brooklyn Brothers Beat the Best by Ryan O'Nan
Bunohan by Dain Said
Cuchera by Joseph Israel Laban
The Good Son by Zaida Bergroth
Habibi by Susan Youssef
Hanaan by Ruslan Pak
Historias que so existem quando lembradas by Júlia Murat
The Invader by Nicolas Provost
J'aime regarder les filles by Fred Louf
Lost in Paradise by Vũ Ngọc Đãng
The Other Side of Sleep by Rebecca Daly
Pariah by Dee Rees
El circuito de Román by Sebastian Brahm
Summer Games by Rolando Colla
The Sword Identity by Xu Haofeng
La brindille by Emmanuelle Millet
Twilight Portrait by Angelina Nikonova
Volcano by Rúnar Rúnarsson

Reel to Reel
Arirang by Kim Ki-duk
The Boy Who Was a King by Andrey Paounov
Comic-Con Episode Four: A Fan's Hope by Morgan Spurlock
Crazy Horse by Frederick Wiseman
Dark Girls by D. Channsin Berry and Bill Duke
Duch, Master of the Forges of Hell by Rithy Panh
The Education of Auma Obama by Branwen Okpako
Gerhard Richter - Painting by Corinna Belz
Girl Model by David Redmon and Ashley Sabin
I'm Carolyn Parker by Jonathan Demme
In My Mother's Arms by Atea Al-Daradji and Mohamed Al-Daradji
Into the Abyss by Werner Herzog
Last Call at the Oasis by Jessica Yu
The Last Dogs of Winter by Costa Botes
The Last Gladiators by Alex Gibney
Paradise Lost 3: Purgatory by Joe Berlinger and Bruce Sinofsky
Paul Williams Still Alive by Stephen Kessler
Pink Ribbons, Inc. by Léa Pool
Samsara by Ron Fricke
Sarah Palin: You Betcha! by Nick Broomfield and Joan Churchill
The Story of Film: An Odyssey by Mark Cousins
Surviving Progress by Mathieu Roy and Harold Crooks
The Tall Man by Tony Krawitz
Undefeated by Daniel Lindsay and T.J. Martin
Urbanized by Gary Hustwit
Whores' Glory by Michael Glawogger

Vanguard
Carré blanc by Jean-Baptiste Léonetti
Doppelgänger Paul by Kris Elgstrand and Dylan Akio Smith 
Generation P by Victor Ginzburg
Headshot by Pen-Ek Ratanaruang
Hidden Driveway by Sarah Goodman
i am a good person/i am a bad person by Ingrid Veninger
Love and Bruises by Lou Ye
Oslo, August 31st by Joachim Trier
Snowtown by Justin Kurzel
The Year of the Tiger by Sebastián Lelio

TIFF Kids
First Position by Bess Kargman
The Flying Machine, by Martin Clapp, Geoff Lindsey and Dorota Kobiela
A Letter to Momo by Hiroyuki Okiura
A Monster in Paris by Bibo Bergeron

Mavericks
Barrymore by Érik Canuel
Deepa Mehta and Salman Rushdie
In Conversation With...Francis Ford Coppola
The Island President by Jon Shenk
The Love We Make by Bradley Kaplan Albert Maysles
Neil Young Journeys by Jonathan Demme
Sony Pictures Classics 20th Anniversary: Michael Barker and Tom Bernard
Tahrir 2011: The Good, the Bad, and the Politician by Tamer Ezzat, Ahmad Abdalla, Ayten Amin and Amr Salama
Tilda Swinton

City to City: Buenos Aires
Caprichosos de San Telmo by Alison Murray
The Cat Vanishes by Carlos Sorín
City to City Panel: Buenos Aires
Crane World by Pablo Trapero
Fatherland by Nicolás Prividera
Invasión by Hugo Santiago
A Mysterious World by Rodrigo Moreno
Pompeya by Tamae Garateguy
Las piedras by Román Cárdenas
The Student by Santiago Mitre
Vaquero by Juan Minujín

Contemporary World Cinema
388 Arletta Avenue by Randall Cole
Always Brando by Ridha Behi
Azhagarsamiyin Kuthirai by Suseenthiran
Beauty by Oliver Hermanus
Billy Bishop Goes to War by Barbara Willis Sweete
Blood of My Blood by João Canijo
Bonsai by Cristián Jiménez
Color of the Ocean by Maggie Peren
Death for Sale by Faouzi Bensaïdi
Elena by Andrey Zvyagintsev
Extraterrestrial by Nacho Vigalondo
Footnote by Joseph Cedar
The Forgiveness of Blood by Joshua Marston
Free Men by Ismaël Ferroukhi
From up on Poppy Hill by Gorō Miyazaki
A Funny Man by Martin Zandvliet
Future Lasts Forever by Özcan Alper
Bé omid é didar by Mohammad Rasoulof
Goodbye First Love by Mia Hansen-Løve
Guilty by Vincent Garenq
Gypsy by Martin Šulík
Heleno by José Henrique Fonseca
Himizu by Sion Sono
Hotel Swooni by Kaat Beels
I'm Yours by Leonard Farlinger
Islands by Stefano Chiantini
Juan of the Dead by Alejandro Brugués
Land of Oblivion by Michale Boganim
Last Days in Jerusalem by Tawfik Abu Wael
Last Winter by John Shank
Lena by Christophe Van Rompaey
Lipstikka by Jonathan Sagall
Lucky by Avie Luthra
Man on Ground by Akin Omotoso
Michael by Markus Schleinzer
Michael by Ribhu Dasgupta
Miss Bala by Gerardo Naranjo
Mr. Tree by Han Jie
Omar Killed Me by Roschdy Zem
Restoration by Yossi Madmoni
Rose by Wojciech Smarzowski
Rough Hands by Mohamed Asli
A Separation by Asghar Farhadi
The Silver Cliff by Karim Aïnouz
Sisters & Brothers by Carl Bessai
Sons of Norway by Jens Lien
SuperClásico by Ole Christian Madsen
Think of Me by Bryan Wizemann
UFO in Her Eyes by Xiaolu Guo
Union Square by Nancy Savoca
Your Sister's Sister by Lynn Shelton

Canada First!
Amy George by Yonah Lewis and Calvin Thomas
Leave It on the Floor by Sheldon Larry
Nuit 1 by Anne Émond
The Odds by Simon Davidson
The Patron Saints by Brian M. Cassidy and Melanie Shatzky
Romeo Eleven (Roméo Onze) by Ivan Grbovic
Wetlands (Marécages) by Guy Édoin

Short Cuts Canada

4am by Janine Fung
Acqua by Raha Shirazi
Afternoon Tea by DJ Parmar
Combustion by Renaud Hallée
Derailments by Chelsea McMullan
The Devil's Due by Alexander Gorelick
Doubles with Slight Pepper by Ian Harnarine
The Encounter by Nicholas Pye
A Film Portrait on Reconstructing 12 Possibilities that Preceded the Disappearance of Zoe Dean Drum by Eduardo Menz
The Fuse: Or How I Burned Simon Bolivar by Igor Drljača
Heart of Rhyme by Cory Bowles
Hope by Pedro Pires
If I Can Fly by Yoakim Bélanger
Issues by Enrico Colantoni and Hugh Dillon 
Lie Down and Die by Kyle Sanderson
Little Theatres: Homage to the Mineral of Cabbage by Stephanie Dudley
Mandeep by Darrin Klimek
No Words Came Down by Ryan Flowers
Of Events by Mathieu Tremblay
One Night with You by Jeanne Leblanc
Ora by Philippe Baylaucq
The Paris Quintet in Practice Makes Perfect by Benjamin Schuetze
Patch Town by Craig Goodwill
Pathways by Dusty Mancinelli
The Pedestrian Jar by Evan Morgan
The Red Virgin by Sheila Pye
A River in the Woods by Christian Sparkes
La Ronde by Sophie Goyette
Vent solaire by Ian Lagarde
Sorry, Rabbi by Mark Slutsky
Spirit of the Bluebird by Xstine Cook and Jesse Gouchey
Les dimanches by Jean-Guillaume Bastien
Surveillant by Yan Giroux
Tabula Rasa by Matthew Rankin
Throat Song by Miranda de Pencier
Trotteur by Arnaud Brisebois and Francis Leclerc
Up in Cottage Country by Simon Ennis
Waning by Gina Haraszti
We Ate the Children Last by Andrew Cividino
Le poids du vide by Alain Fournier
The Yodeling Farmer by Mike Maryniuk and John Scoles

Canada Open Vault
Hard Core Logo by Bruce McDonald

Visions
Alps by Yorgos Lanthimos
Century of Birthing by Lav Diaz
Cut by Amir Naderi
Dreileben - Etwas Besseres als den Tod by Christian Petzold
Dreileben - Komm mir nicht nach by Dominik Graf
Dreileben - Eine Minute Dunkel by Christoph Hochhäusler
Fable of the Fish by Adolfo Alix, Jr.
House of Tolerance by Bertrand Bonello
Kotoko by Shinya Tsukamoto
The Last Christeros by Matias Meyer
The Loneliest Planet by Julia Loktev
Monsters Club by Toshiaki Toyoda
The Mountain by Ghassan Salhab
Mushrooms by Vimukthi Jayasundara
Play by Ruben Östlund
Porfirio by Alejandro Landes
Random by Debbie Tucker Green
The River Used to Be a Man by Jan Zabeil
Swirl by Helvécio Marins Jr.
This Side of Resurrection by Joaquim Sapinho

Wavelengths
 349 (for Sol LeWitt) by Chris Kennedy
 99 Clerkenwell Road by Sophie Michael
 Aberration of Light: Dark Chamber Disclosure by Sandra Gibson, Luis Recoder and Olivia Block
 American Colour by Joshua Bonnetta
 Ars colonia by Raya Martin
 Black Mirror at the National Gallery by Mark Lewis
 Bouquets 11-20 by Rose Lowder
 Chevelle by Kevin Jerome Everson
 Coorow-Latham Road by Blake Williams
 Edwin Parker by Tacita Dean
 Empire by Apichatpong Weerasethakul
 Found Cuban Mounts by Adriana Salazar Arroyo
 I Will Forget This Day by Alina Rudnitskaya
 Loutra/Baths by Nick Collins
 Optra Field VII-IX by T. Marie
 A Preface to Red by Jonathan Schwartz
 Resonance by Karen Johannesen
 The Return by Nathaniel Dorsky
 Sack Barrow by Ben Rivers
 Sailboat by Joyce Wieland
 Sea Series#10 by John Price
 Space is the Place by Eriko Sonoda
 Twenty Cigarettes by James Benning
 Untitled by Neïl Beloufa
 Young Pines by Ute Aurand

Future Projections
 Buffalo Days by Peter Lynch
 Light as a Feather, Stiff as a Board by Nicholas Pye and Sheila Pye
 Memories of Idaho by James Franco and Gus Van Sant
 Mr. Brainwash in Toronto by Mr. Brainwash
 Plot against Time by David Rokeby
 Road Movie by Elle Flanders and Tamira Sawatzky
 Sanctuary by Gregory Crewdson
 Slow Action by Ben Rivers
 Sunday by Duane Hopkins
 Time as Activity (Buenos Aires) by David Lamelas
 whiteonwhite:algorithmicnoir by Eve Sussman Rufus Corporation

Midnight Madness
 The Day by Doug Aarniokoski
 God Bless America by Bobcat Goldthwait
 The Incident by Alexandre Courtes
 Kill List by Ben Wheatley
 Livid by Julien Maury and Alexandre Bustillo
 Lovely Molly by Eduardo Sánchez
 The Raid by Gareth Evans
 Sleepless Night by Frédéric Jardin
 Smuggler by Katsuhito Ishii
 You're Next by Adam Wingard

Canada's Top Ten
TIFF's annual Canada's Top Ten list, its national critics and festival programmers poll of the ten best feature and short films of the year, was released on December 7, 2011.

Feature films
Café de Flore — Jean-Marc Vallée
Citizen Gangster — Nathan Morlando
A Dangerous Method — David Cronenberg
Hobo With a Shotgun — Jason Eisener
Keyhole — Guy Maddin
Monsieur Lazhar — Philippe Falardeau
The Salesman (Le Vendeur) — Sébastien Pilote
Starbuck — Ken Scott
Take This Waltz — Sarah Polley
Wetlands (Marécages) — Guy Édoin

Short films
Choke — Michelle Latimer
Doubles with Slight Pepper — Ian Harnarine
The Fuse: Or How I Burned Simon Bolivar — Igor Drljaca
Hope — Pedro Pires
No Words Came Down — Ryan Flowers, Lisa Pham
Ora — Philippe Baylaucq
Rhonda's Party — Ashley McKenzie
La Ronde — Sophie Goyette
Trotteur — Arnaud Brisebois, Francis Leclerc
We Ate the Children Last — Andrew Cividino

References

External links
 Official site
 2011 Toronto International Film Festival at IMDb

2011
2011 film festivals
2011 in Toronto
2011 in Canadian cinema
2011 festivals in North America